Sándor Ormándi (7 February 1922 – 13 September 2006) was a Hungarian rower. He competed in the men's double sculls event at the 1948 Summer Olympics.

References

External links
 

1922 births
2006 deaths
Hungarian male rowers
Olympic rowers of Hungary
Rowers at the 1948 Summer Olympics
Sportspeople from Fejér County